Orient Express is a 1954 drama film directed by Carlo Ludovico Bragaglia and starring Silvana Pampanini, Henri Vidal, Folco Lulli, Eva Bartok, and Curd Jürgens. It was made as a co-production between Italy, France and West Germany.

It was shot at the Farnesina Studios of Titanus in Rome and on location in the Dolomites. The film's sets were designed by the art director Ottavio Scotti.

Plot
The plot revolves around a two-day stop at a village in the Alps by passengers on the Orient Express.

Reviews 
The national and international reviews were mostly bad. Below are three examples:

"Intermezzo" wrote: "The Italian and German film industries collaborated in the production of this film, which, judging by the results, did not deserve so much fervor of international activity."

Der Spiegel wrote: “After 150 long meters, the express gets stuck in an avalanche of snow and the film gets stuck in a conglomeration of boredom and acting mistakes (Silvana Pampanini and Eva Bartok), which proves once again that co-productions are often not just a cost - but also bring about a reduction in quality.”

The Lexikon des Internationales Films states: "One of the first major international co-productions with German participation after the Second World War: with popular film stars, but without speed, excitement and credibility."

Cast
 Silvana Pampanini as Beatrice Landi 
 Henri Vidal as Jacques Ferrand 
 Folco Lulli as Filippo dal Pozzo 
 Robert Arnoux as Jean Tribot aka Mr. Davis 
 Eva Bartok as Roxane 
 Curd Jürgens as Bate 
 Michael Lenz as Giovanni 
 Liliane Bert as Agnès, the pharmacist
 Olga Solbelli as Olga, la ricevitrice postale 
 Gemma Bolognesi
 Arturo Bragaglia
 Giuseppe Chinnici
 Liliana de Curtis
 Anita Durante
 Ugo Filipponi
 Ivo Garrani
 Mimma Gheducci
 Iga Ritzenfeld
 Sandro Ruffini
 Tullio Tomadoni

References

Bibliography
 Chiti, Roberto & Poppi, Roberto. Dizionario del cinema italiano: Dal 1945 al 1959. Gremese Editore, 1991.
 Wiesenthal, Mauricio. The belle époque of the Orient-Express. Crescent Books, 1979.

External links

1954 films
1950s Christmas drama films
West German films
1950s Italian-language films
Films set in the Alps
Films set on the Orient Express
Films shot in Rome
Films produced by Raymond Borderie
Italian Christmas drama films
Films directed by Carlo Ludovico Bragaglia
French Christmas drama films
German Christmas drama films
1954 drama films
Films scored by Renzo Rossellini
1950s Italian films
1950s French films
1950s German films
Italian-language French films
Italian-language German films